The Fairbairn–Sykes fighting knife is a double-edged fighting knife resembling a dagger or poignard with a foil grip. It was developed by William Ewart Fairbairn and Eric Anthony Sykes in Shanghai based on ideas that the two men had while serving on the Shanghai Municipal Police in China before World War II.

The F-S fighting knife was made famous during World War II when issued to British Commandos, the Airborne Forces, the SAS and many other units, especially for the Normandy landings in June 1944. With its acutely tapered, sharply pointed blade, the F-S fighting knife is frequently described as a stiletto, a weapon optimised for thrusting, although the F-S knife can be used to inflict slash cuts upon an opponent when its cutting edges are sharpened according to specification.  The Wilkinson Sword Company made the knife with minor pommel and grip design variations.

History
The F-S knife is strongly associated with the British commandos and the US Office of Strategic Services (OSS) and Marine Raiders (who based their issued knife on the Fairbairn-Sykes), among other special forces. It features in the insignia of the British 3 Commando Brigade, the Belgian Commandos, the Dutch Commando Corps (founded in the UK during World War II), and of the Australian 1st Commando and 2nd Commando Regiments and United States Army Rangers (all founded with the help of the British Commandos). Large numbers of Fairbairn Sykes knives of varying types, including some with wooden grips, were used by the 3rd Canadian Infantry Division that landed on Juno Beach on "D" Day and by the men of the 1st Canadian Parachute Battalion. A solid gold F-S fighting knife is part of the commandos' memorial at Westminster Abbey.

The first batch of 50 F-S fighting knives was produced in January 1941 by Wilkinson Sword Ltd. Fairbairn and Sykes had travelled to their factory from the Special Training Centre at Lochailort in November 1940 to discuss their ideas for a fighting knife.

A batch of 1500 knives of this first pattern was ordered in Nov 1940. An order for 38,000 of the second pattern (slightly revised for wartime exigencies) followed in 1941. By the time of the third pattern of design refinements (dating from October 1943) the knife was being produced by several manufacturers. No formal specification existed until after the war, but the 1949 UK government specification E/1323E remains current.

In December 2019, an SBS commando in Afghanistan used an F-S knife during an ambush by ISIL fighters.

Design

The F-S fighting knife was designed for surprise attack and fighting, with a slender blade that can easily penetrate a ribcage. The vase handle provides precise grip, and the blade's design is especially suited to its use as a fighting knife. Fairbairn's rationale is in his book Get Tough! (1942).
In close-quarters fighting there is no more deadly weapon than the knife. In choosing a knife there are two important factors to bear in mind: balance and keenness. The hilt should fit easily in your hand, and the blade should not be so heavy that it tends to drag the hilt from your fingers in a loose grip. It is essential that the blade have a sharp stabbing point and good cutting edges, because an artery torn through (as against a clean cut) tends to contract and stop the bleeding. If a main artery is cleanly severed, the wounded man will quickly lose consciousness and die.

The Fairbairn-Sykes was produced in several patterns. First-pattern knives have a  blade with a flat area, or ricasso, at the top of the blade under the S-shaped crossguard; this was not present on the original design and its presence has not been explained by the manufacturers. Second-pattern knives have a slightly longer blade (just less than ), -wide oval crossguard, knurled pattern grip, and rounded ball, and may be stamped "ENGLAND" (a US legal requirement when importing the surplus knives after WWII) on the handle side of the cross guard. Some may also be stamped with a "broad arrow" British issue mark and a number (e.g., 21) on the opposite handle side of the cross guard. Third-pattern knives also have a similarly sized seven-inch blade, but the handle was redesigned to be a ringed grip. This ringed grip is reputed to have disappointed one of the original designers as it unbalanced the weapon and made harder to hold when wet, but it was used by the manufacturers as it was simple to produce and could be cast from a cheaper and more plentiful alloy instead of using up quantities of scarce brass stock. William Rodgers, as part of the Egginton Group, produce an all-black "sterile" version of the knife, devoid of any markings showing maker for NATO use.

In all cases the handle had a distinctive foil-like grip to enable a number of handling options. Many variations on the F-S fighting knife exist, in size of blade and particularly of handle. The design has influenced the design of knives throughout the period since its introduction.

Copies
Because of the success of the Fairbairn-Sykes knife in World War II and in the wars in Korea and Vietnam, many companies made their own versions of the F-S fighting knife, such as the 1966 Gerber Mark II.

Almost two million of the British knives were made. Early production runs were extremely limited and demand was high, with many British troops attempting to buy their own.

OSS version

The OSS stiletto was a double-edged knife based on the Fairbairn–Sykes fighting knife. It was so admired that the US military created several other fighting knives based on it. The US Office of Strategic Services's knife manufacturing bid was approximately one-fifteenth of the British equivalent, but the US version of the knife, manufactured by Landers, Frary & Clark, of New Britain, Connecticut, was improperly tempered and inferior to the British F-S fighting knife in materials and workmanship. Its reputation suffered accordingly. A total of 20,000 units of the OSS version were produced. The OSS dagger was officially replaced in service in 1944 by the US M3 fighting knife. The scabbard for the OSS stiletto looks like a pancake spatula, a design that can be worn high or low on the belt, or angled either left or right. In theory this gave a very adaptable mounting system, but the metal belt attachment risked injury to those wearing it, especially parachutists during airborne operations.

V42 and smatchet
General Robert T. Frederick of the Devil's Brigade (First Special Service Force) is credited with a similar weapon, the V-42 commando knife 
V-42 stiletto, itself a derivation of the F-S design. The V-42 was manufactured by W. R. Case & Sons Cutlery Co. in the US circa 1942-43 and is distinguished mainly by its markings and the presence of a small, scored indentation for the wielder's thumb, to aid in orienting the knife for thrusting. Fairbairn has been given full or partial credit for the design of several other fighting knives, including the smatchet.

Users

Current
 : 1st & 2nd Commando Regiments
 : Kopassus
 : Grup Gerak Khas
 : Singapore Commandos.
 : FS knife clones made for Spanish airborne soldiers.

Former

 : Some used by Australian soldiers in the Vietnam War.
 : Formerly used by First Special Service Force.
 : Formerly used by French Resistance fighters.
 : 250 FS knives ordered between 1969 and 1979.
 : 500 FS knives ordered.
 : 400 FS knives ordered in 1961.
 : 300 FS knives ordered.
 : 450 FS knives ordered in 1962.
 : Formerly used by the SAS, the Special Service Brigade, the Chindits, SBS, and the Parachute Regiment (United Kingdom).
 : Some used during the Vietnam War by some United States Army Special Forces soldiers. Formerly used by United States Army Rangers, Marine Raiders, and the First Special Service Force.

See also
 Applegate–Fairbairn fighting knife
 BC-41
 Pattern 1907 bayonet

References

Further reading
 Buerlein, Robert. (2002). Allied Military Fighting Knives: And The Men Who Made Them Famous. Paladin Press. 
 Flook, Ron. (1999). British and Commonwealth Military Knives. Howell Press Inc. 
 Locken, Alan. (1995). The Collectors Guide to the Fairbairn Sykes Fighting Knife. Alan W Locken.
 Peter-Michel, Wolfgang: The Fairbairn-Sykes Fighting Knife: Collecting Britain's Most Iconic Dagger. Schiffer Publishing Ltd. 
 
 Wilkinson-Latham, Robert. (2009). Wilkinsons and the F.S. Fighting Knife. 2nd ed. Pooley Sword Publishing.

External links

 Fighting knives used by British commandos and SOE during WW2
 The Fairbairn Sykes Fighting Knives

Daggers
World War II infantry weapons
Royal Marines
Military knives
World War II military equipment of the United Kingdom
World War II military equipment of the United States
Weapons and ammunition introduced in 1941